Aleksandr Seleznyov (born 25 January 1964) is a retired male hammer thrower from Russia. His personal best throw is 81.70 metres, achieved in May 1993 in Sochi.

He was the trainer for Olga Kuzenkova, the first woman to throw the hammer more than 70 meters.

Achievements

Notes

External links

1964 births
Living people
Russian male hammer throwers
Soviet male hammer throwers